Kasturba Nagar Assembly constituency  is one of the seventy Delhi assembly constituencies of Delhi in northern India.
Kasturba Nagar assembly constituency is a part of New Delhi (Lok Sabha constituency).

Members of Legislative Assembly
Key

Election results

2020

2015

2013

2008

2003

1998

1993

References

Assembly constituencies of Delhi
Delhi Legislative Assembly
Memorials to Kasturba Gandhi